Jason Craig Gummer (born 27 October 1967) is a Welsh former professional footballer.

After progressing through the youth setup at Cardiff City, Gummer made his professional debut for the club on 7 September 1985 in a 1–1 draw with York City. However, he struggled with injuries and, after a short loan spell with Torquay United, he was released by the club in 1989. He later played in the Welsh Premier League for Inter Cardiff and Ebbw Vale.

References

1967 births
Living people
Welsh footballers
Cardiff City F.C. players
Torquay United F.C. players
Ebbw Vale F.C. players
English Football League players
Cymru Premier players
Association football midfielders
Inter Cardiff F.C. players